RE-2000 is a studio album released in 1999 by the Washington, D.C.-based go-go band Rare Essence.

Track listing

"Intro" – 3:36
"We Push" (featuring – Redman) – 5:55
"Keep it Real" – 0:21
"RE-2000" – 4:16
"What Nigga What?" – 6:34
"Dinner Anyone?" – 1:28
"Hoodrat" (featuring Ms. Kim) – 6:59
"Where are You Now?" (featuring Tony Blunt) – 5:02
"R.E. Unplugged" – 0:46
"As if You Where Mine" – 3:56
"Chillin' in the Hood" – 0:20
"Party in My Neighborhood" – 4:44
"Too Much Goin' On" – 0:20
"Beam is on Your Head" – 4:24
"Damn Right" - 3:51
"Captain Brady" – 0:17
"How Can I Know?" – 5:05
"Thank You" – 7:30

Personnel
Byron "BJ" Jackson – keyboards
Andre "White Boy" Johnson – electric guitar, vocals,
Kent Wood – keyboards
Redman – guest vocals
Eric Butcher – timbales
Donnell Floyd – saxophone, vocals
Adebayo "De De" Folarin – vocals
Kimberly "Ms. Kim" Graham – vocals
Tony Blunt – vocals

References

External links
RE-2000 at Discogs

1999 albums
Rare Essence albums